Kettleshulme (Old Norse Ketil's island or Ketil's watermeadow)  is a village and civil parish in Cheshire, England. The village is close to the border with Derbyshire, on the B5470 road from Whaley Bridge to Macclesfield in the valley of the Todd Brook, a tributary of the River Goyt. In 2001 it had a population of 353.

Geology and climate
The geology around Kettleshulme consists of Carboniferous limestone, shale and gritstone. The original settlement mainly consisted of a mixture of limestone and sandstone buildings, including the old church, built in the 19th century out of limestone quarried near Buxton, seven miles away.

Transport and accessibility
The village is in the Pennines,  from the centre of Manchester, making it popular with commuters. A bus service from Disley goes through Kettleshulme to Macclesfield. The nearest railway station is Whaley Bridge on the Manchester–Buxton line.

Economy and tourism
Kettleshulme was once a centre for the manufacture of candle-wick material but this ceased in 1937. The old abandoned mill (Lumbhole Mill 1797, rebuilt 1823) still exists but is not in use. It is a Grade II* listed building, described by English Heritage as "the last example of a mill where water-powered and steam machinery were used together and survive intact". Kettleshulme was the home of 19th-century record-breaker Amos Broadhurst, whose beard grew to a length of seven feet.

The area around Kettleshulme is popular with walkers. To the north are the Bowstones, an early Christian stone sculpture, and nearby Lyme Park. From the Bowstones, it is possible on a clear day to see up to thirty miles in all directions, including, to the west, the Lovell Telescope at Jodrell Bank, at one time the world's largest radio telescope, to the north-west, the city of Manchester and its airport and to the east, the rest of the High Peak including Kinder Scout, the Derbyshire's highest point, and Windgather Rocks.

See also

Listed buildings in Kettleshulme

References

External links

Kettleshulme Parish website

Civil parishes in Cheshire
Villages in Cheshire
Towns and villages of the Peak District